Silver Star Mountain can refer to:

 Silver Star Mountain (Skamania County, Washington)
 Silver Star Mountain (Okanogan County, Washington)
 Silver Star Mountain Resort